Asimuddin Bhoongar (died in 1064-65) was a King of Sindh (in Pakistan) and a member of the Soomra dynasty.

Biography 
Asimuddin Bhoongar was born to the unknown parents, and he became a king. He was a Muslim ruler.

With an unknown woman (a wife or a concubine), he fathered at least one child — a son, Asamuddin Daula Dodo. Asimuddin Bhoongar died in 1064-65, and he was succeeded by his son — who was also known as Dodo-I — and through him, Asimuddin Bhoongar was the grandfather of the Queen Zainab Tari (زينب تاري) and the King Shahabuddin Sanghar.

References 

History of Sindh
Shia monarchs
Sindhi people
Pakistani royalty